Indoor volleyball at the 2009 Southeast Asian Games were held in gymnasium 2, National Sport Complex, Vientiane, Laos.  Beach volleyball at the games was held in the beach volleyball stadium of the National Sport Complex.

Medal summary

Medalist

Indoor volleyball

Beach volleyball

Indoor volleyball

Men

Preliminary round

Group A

  - Withdraw

Group B

Knockout stage

Semifinals

5th place

Bronze-medal match

Gold-medal match

Final standing

Women

Round robin

Bronze-medal match

Gold-medal match

Final standing

Beach volleyball

Men

Knockout stage

Overview

Women

Preliminary round

Group A

Group B

Knockout stage

Overview

Quarterfinals

Semifinals

Bronze-medal match

Gold-medal match

Gold-medal match forfeit by injury in first set 9:6 for Phokongploy / Kulna

2009 Southeast Asian Games events
Volleyball at the Southeast Asian Games
2009 in volleyball